Gravity Falls is an American animated television series created by Alex Hirsch for Disney Channel and Disney XD. The series revolves around the various antics of two fraternal twins, Dipper (voiced by Jason Ritter) and Mabel Pines (voiced by Kristen Schaal), who were handed over to their Great Uncle (or "Grunkle") Stan (voiced by Alex Hirsch), who runs a tourist trap called The Mystery Shack, in the town of Gravity Falls, Oregon. They soon realize that the mysterious town holds plenty of secrets. When Dipper finds an old journal in the forest, their everyday lifestyle changes with odd things and creatures they encounter.

A pilot for Gravity Falls was pitched to Disney Channel in 2010 which led to the series being green-lit. The series premiered on Disney Channel on June 15, 2012. On March 12, 2013, the show was renewed for a second season. However, Disney did not officially confirm the second season until July 29, 2013. The second season premiered on August 1, 2014, on Disney Channel, and on August 4, 2014, on Disney XD. On November 20, 2015, Alex Hirsch stated that the second season of the show would be the last, and would conclude with the final part of the three-part finale entitled "Weirdmageddon". The episode aired on February 15, 2016.

Series overview

Episodes

Pilot (2010)
Prior to the creation of Gravity Falls, Alex Hirsch was helping to develop the Disney Channel animated series Fish Hooks, when Disney contacted him and asked him if he would like to pitch his own animated series to the network, which Hirsch accepted. Disney commissioned Hirsch to create an eleven-minute low-budget flash animated pilot for Gravity Falls which he later described as "a short version of Tourist Trapped". In December 2010, it was announced that Disney Channel had green-lit Gravity Falls for a full series based on the pilot which was originally slated to premiere in spring of 2012. 

The pilot was never broadcast on television and for many years Hirsch had no intention of releasing it to the public. During the Cipher Hunt in July 2016, Hirsch made the promise to finally release the pilot as a reward for completing the 2,000 piece jigsaw puzzle which was a clue in the hunt. The puzzle was completed on August 1, 2016 and Hirsch uploaded the Gravity Falls pilot to the Internet on August 3.

Season 1 (2012–13)

Season 2 (2014–16)

Shorts
The short series, Dipper's Guide to the Unexplained, Mabel's Guide to Life, Fixin' It with Soos, TV Shorts and Mabel's Scrapbook, aired between the first and second season of Gravity Falls.

Shorts overview

Creature in the Closet (2012)

Dipper's Guide to the Unexplained (2013)

Mabel's Guide to Life (2014)

Fixin' It with Soos (2014)

Public Access TV (2014)

Mabel's Scrapbook (2014)

Creepy Letters from Lil' Gideon (2014)

Old Man McGucket's Conspiracy Corner (2015)

Grunkle Stan's Lost Mystery Shack Interviews (2015)

'Pocalypse Preppin' (2015)

Mystery Shack: Shop at Home with Mr. Mystery (2015)

Soos' Stan Fiction (2017)

Gravity Falls x Line Rider (2020)

Call Me Maybe Parody (2020)

Behind-the-scenes special

Box set exclusives

Notes

References

External links
List of Gravity Falls episodes at The Futon Critic
List of Gravity Falls episodes on MSN

Lists of American children's animated television series episodes
Lists of Disney Channel television series episodes
Gravity Falls